Emar (modern Tell Meskene) is an archaeological site in Aleppo Governorate, northern Syria. It sits in the great bend of the mid-Euphrates, now on the shoreline of the man-made Lake Assad near the town of Maskanah. It has been the source of many cuneiform tablets, making it rank with Ugarit, Mari and Ebla among the most important archaeological sites of Syria. In these texts, dating from the 14th century BC to the fall of Emar in 1187 BC, and in excavations in several campaigns since the 1970s, Emar emerges as an important Bronze Age trade center, occupying a liminal position between the power centers of Upper Mesopotamia and Anatolia-Syria. Unlike other cities, the tablets preserved at Emar, most of them in Akkadian and of the thirteenth century BC, are not royal or official, but record private transactions, judicial records, dealings in real estate, marriages, last wills, formal adoptions. In the house of a priest, a library contained literary and lexical texts in the Mesopotamian tradition, and ritual texts for local cults.

History
Emar was strategically sited as a trans-shipping point where trade on the Euphrates was reloaded for shipping by overland route. In the middle of the third millennium BC Emar came under the influence of the rulers of Ebla; the city is mentioned in archives at Ebla. In Mari texts of the eighteenth century BC, (Middle Bronze Age), Emar was under the influence of the neighboring Amorite state of Yamhad. There was no local tradition of kingship at Emar. For the thirteenth and the early twelfth centuries BC (Late Bronze Age), there is written documentation from Emar itself, mostly in the Akkadian language, and also references in contemporaneous texts from Hattusa, Ugarit, and in Assyrian archives; at the time Emar was within the Hittite sphere of influence, subject to the king of Carchemish, a Hittite client-king. 
It was the chief city of a Hittite border province known as
the Land of Astata (Ashtata) which included Tell Fray. Correlating the kings of Emar with the known king-list of Carchemish provides some absolute dating.

Archaeological and written documentation come to an end in the late twelfth century BC as a result of the Bronze Age collapse. The actual date of destruction has been placed at 1187 BC in the 2nd regnal year of king Meli-Shipak II of Babylon

The site remained desolate at the unstable eastern borders of the Roman Empire, resettled nearby as Barbalissos. In 253, it was the site of the Battle of Barbalissos between the Sassanid Persians under Shapur I and Roman troops. Its Byzantine history can be followed at Barbalissos.

Archaeology
The initial salvage excavations in advance of the rising waters of the Syrian Tabqa Dam project impounding Lake El Assad were undertaken by two French teams, in 1972-76, under the direction of Jean-Claude Margueron.

Late Bronze Age temple
Excavations revealed a temple area comprising the sanctuaries of the weather god Ba’al and possibly of his consort Astarte of the Late Bronze Age (thirteenth and early twelfth century BC).

Cuneiform tablets
After the conclusion of the French excavations the site was left unguarded and was systematically looted, bringing many cuneiform tablets onto the antiquities gray market stripped of their context. In 1992, the Syrian Directorate-General of Antiquities and Museums took charge of the site, and a fresh series of campaigns revealed earlier strata, of the Middle and Early Bronze Ages (second half of the third millennium and the first half of the second millennium BC) the Imar that was mentioned in the archives of Mari and elsewhere. Beginning in 1996, the Syrian effort was joined by a team from the University of Tübingen Germany.

So far, around 1100 tablets in Akkadian have been recovered from the site,
800 from the excavation and around 300 emerging on the antiquities market. In
addition 100 tablets in Hurrian and 1 in Hittite have also
been found. All but one of the tablets are from the Late Bronze Age.

Notes

See also

Cities of the ancient Near East
Chronology of the ancient Near East
Tell Hadidi

References

Arnaud, Daniel, Emar: Récherches au pays d'Aştata VI: Textes sumériens et akkadiens, Erc/Adpf, 1987, 
D. Beyer, Meskene-Emar. Dix ans de travaux 1972-1982, Editions Recherche sur les Civilisations, 1982, 
Chavalas, Mark William,Emar: the history, religion, and culture of a Syrian town in the late Bronze Age, CDL Press, 1996, 
D'Alfonso, Lorenzo, Yoram Cohen Dietrich Sürenhagen, The City of Emar Among the Late Bronze Age Empires, Eisenbrauns, 2008, 
Dalley, Stephanie and Beatrice Teissier, Tablets from the Vicinity of Emar and Elsewhere, Iraq, vol. 54, pp. 83–111, 1992
Yoram Cohen, The Scribes and Scholars of the City of Emar in the Late Bronze Age, Eisenbrauns, 2009, 
Fleming, Daniel E., Time at Emar: The Cultic Calendar and the Rituals from the Diviner's Archive, Mesopotamian Civilizations 11, Jerrold S. Cooper ed. Winona Lake, Ind.: Eisenbrauns, 2000.
Fleming, Daniel E., The Installation of Baal's High Priestess at Emar: A Window on Ancient Syrian Religion, Harvard Semitic Studies 42. Atlanta: Scholars Press, 1992.
Eugen J. Pentiuc, West Semitic Vocabulary in the Akkadian Texts from Emar (Harvard Semitic Studies), Eisenbrauns, 2001,

External links
 History of Emar; state of current research, excavations (Tübingen University)

Populated places disestablished in the 2nd millennium BC
1972 archaeological discoveries
Amorite cities
Archaeological sites in Aleppo Governorate
Former populated places in Syria